Jérémy Leveau (born 17 April 1992 in Argentan) is a French cyclist, who currently rides for UCI Continental team . He previously rode for UCI Professional Continental team  for 2018 and 2019.

Major results

2014
 1st  Road race, National Under-23 Road Championships
2015
 4th Paris–Troyes
2017
 3rd Road race, National Road Championships
 4th Polynormande
 5th Paris–Troyes
 5th Grote Prijs Jean-Pierre Monseré
 6th Classic Loire-Atlantique
 6th Paris–Camembert
 6th Tour de Vendée
2020
 7th Tour du Doubs
2021
 9th Grand Prix de la ville de Nogent-sur-Oise
2022
 4th Overall Circuit de la Sarthe

References

External links

1992 births
Living people
People from Argentan
French male cyclists
Sportspeople from Orne
Cyclists from Normandy